Georges Pasquier  (born 11 March 1878) was an early twentieth century French road racing cyclist who participated in the 1905 Tour de France but didn't finish it.

References

External links
 Georges Pasquier's page on CyclingRanking.com

French male cyclists
1878 births
Year of death missing
20th-century deaths
Place of birth missing